Bartonella alsatica is a bacterium. Like other Bartonella species, it can cause disease in animals. It is small, aerobic, oxidase-negative, and Gram-negative. Its rod-like cells were localized within wild rabbit erythrocytes when first described. The type strain is IBS 382T (= CIP 105477T). It is associated with cases of lymphadenitis and endocarditis.

References

Further reading

External links
Bartonella-Associated Infections – CDC
Bartonella species - List of Prokaryotic names with Standing in Nomenclature

Type strain of Bartonella alsatica at BacDive -  the Bacterial Diversity Metadatabase

Bartonellaceae
Bacteria described in 1999